Anagold 24 Erzincanspor is a Turkish football club located in Erzincan, Turkey.

History 
The club was founded in 1984 under the name Refahiyespor, in the town Refahiye, Erzincan Province. The biggest club in the region, Erzincanspor, dissolved in 2014 and Refahiyespor changed its name to Erzincan Refahiyespor as of July 2012. It lay its claim as the (unofficial) successor club. On 5 August 2015, the club again changed its name to 24 Erzincanspor. On 8 August 2016, 24 Erzincanspor was sponsored by the Turkish mining company Anagold, and was thereafter known as Anagold 24 Erzincanspor. Being an amateur club for most of its existence, on 24 July 2020 it won the TFF Third League playoff finals in a 2–0 win over Aksaray Belediyespor and was promoted into the TFF Second League for the first time in its history.

Colours and badge 
24 Erzincanspor's colors are red and black.

Current squad

Other players under contract

Notable (ex-)players
 Kerem Aktürkoğlu
 Hayrullah Mert Akyüz
 Muhammed Demirci

References

External links 
 24 Erzincanspor Official website
 TFF Profile

24 Erzincanspor
Football clubs in Turkey
Association football clubs established in 1984
Sport in Erzincan